Moolji Jetha College, also spelt as "Moolji Jaitha College", is a college in Jalgaon, Maharashtra. It was established in 1945 and is one of the oldest Colleges in the northern Maharashtra region.

It is now affiliated to North Maharashtra University, but was earlier under Savitribai Phule Pune University. Run by Khandesh College Education Society, the college offers undergraduate and postgraduate programs in traditional and professional courses.

Notable alumni
Pratibha Patil, 12th President of India

References

External links
Mooljee Jetha College, Jalgaonhttps://www.kcesmjcollege.in

Educational institutions established in 1945
Universities and colleges in Maharashtra
Education in Jalgaon
1945 establishments in India